"Moviendo Caderas", ("") is a song by Puerto Rican reggaeton recording artist Yandel featuring Daddy Yankee, from his second studio album, De Líder a Leyenda (2013). It was composed by Yandel, with the help of Ramón L. Ayala (Daddy Yankee), Victor Delgado, Eliezer Palacios, Gabriel Rodríguez, Francisco Saldaña, Geancarlos Rivera Tapia and Jonathan Rivera Tapia, it was produced by Luny Tunes, Jonathan Rivera Tapia and Predikador. It was announced through his Twitter that the song would be released as the third single off the album on February 10, 2014. The song's accompanying music video was directed by Carlos Pérez and filmed in Puerto Rico. The video was premiered on Vevo on February 21, 2014. and it is also selected for Univision's Thursday Night Football.

Critical reception
Lety Zárate from Monitor Latino gave the song a positive review and said that: "Hablé de Ti" and "Hasta Abajo" were the first two letters that Yandel played in the Hispanic radio from the United States and Puerto Rico making pleasant and unexpected results. However one would have to come third proposal to overcome the above and does so accompanied by the voice and talent of Daddy Yankee, who impresses with a contagious flavor to "Moviendo Caderas" – "Moviendo Caderas" is a clear invitation to relaxation, the party that has always characterized Yandel on their way through the music market."

Charts

Weekly charts

Year-end charts

Certifications

References

2014 singles
Yandel songs
Daddy Yankee songs
Spanish-language songs
Songs written by Daddy Yankee
2013 songs
Songs written by Yandel
Song recordings produced by Luny Tunes
Sony Music Latin singles
Songs written by Francisco Saldaña